The 2000 Little League Softball World Series was held in Portland, Oregon from August 13 to August 19, 2000. Four teams from the United States and four from throughout the world competed for the Little League Softball World Champions.

Teams
Each team that competes in the tournament will come out of one of the 8 regions.

Bracket
See footnote.

Consolation

Final standings

References

2000 in softball
2000 in sports in Oregon
Little League Softball World Series
Softball in Oregon